This is a list of finalists for the 2009 Archibald Prize for portraiture (listed is Artist – Title).

 Anthony Bennett –  self-portrait in the bathroom discussing beauty, bukowski and brett whiteley with my ex, now a stripper, who likes to dress as wonder woman
 Ann Cape –  Lucy & friend
 Adam Chang –  Spirit of an ancient culture
 Mike Chavez –  Portrait of a bad muthaf***a
 Jun Chen –  Ray Hughes and five other moods
 Zhansui Kordelya Chi –  Good morning, this is Neil Mitchell
 Yvette Coppersmith –  John Safran
 Sam Cranstoun – Gyton
 Leeanne Crisp –  Considering Persephone. Portrait of Gay Bilson
 Ngaire Devenport –  Ken Done
 Vincent Fantauzzo – Brandon (Brandon Walters) (Winner of the People's Choice Award) 
 Hong Fu –  Dame Elisabeth Murdoch
 David Griggs –  Zoloft nation (self-portrait)
 Peter Hanley –  Remembering Titian
 Robert Hannaford –  Self-portrait
 Nicholas Harding –  Margaret Whitlam
 Cherry Hood –  David Helfgott
 Paul Jackson – Flacco's chariot (Paul Livingston) (Winner of the Packing Room Prize)
 Jasper Knight –  Jasper Knight
 Richard Larter –  Portrait of Nell
 Sam Leach –  Marcia Langton
 Mathew Lynn –  Heiress
 Abbey McCulloch –  Nell
 Angus McDonald –  Beyond
 Alexander McKenzie –  Richard Clapton
 Guy Maestri –  Geoffrey Gurrumul Yunupingu (Winner of the Archibald Prize)
 Nick Mourtzakis –  A portrait of Alex Wodak
 Richard Onn –  Coupe SX010F
 David Paulson & Michael Nelson Tjakamarra –  Michael Nelson Jagamarra & singing rain story
 James Powditch –  Peter Powditch is a dead man smoking
 Ben Quilty –  Jimmy Barnes – there but for the grace of God no. 2
 Megan Roodenrys –  Waiting for the day
 Paul Ryan –  Mountain of Tom
 Jenny Sages –  Heidi & Sarah-Jane ‘parallel lives’
 Megan Seres –  The rest is silence (Brendan Cowell as Hamlet)
 Garry Shead & Adrienne Levenson –  Soffritto di Lucio
 Mark Thompson –  Greta Scacchi as Queen Elizabeth in Mary Stuart
 Jan Williamson –  Nancy Kunoth Petyarr 
 Michael Zavros –  Ars longa, vita brevis

See also 
Previous year: List of Archibald Prize 2008 finalists
Next year: List of Archibald Prize 2010 finalists
List of Archibald Prize winners

External links
Archibald Prize 2009 finalists, official website, Art Gallery of NSW

2009
Archibald
Archibald Prize 2009
Archibald Prize 2009
2009 in art
Arch
Archibald